The 1881 Chicago White Stockings season was the 10th season of the Chicago White Stockings franchise, the 6th in the National League and the 4th at Lakefront Park. The White Stockings won the National League championship with a record of 56–28.

Regular season

Season standings

Record vs. opponents

Roster

Player stats

Batting

Starters by position
Note: Pos = Position; G = Games played; AB = At bats; H = Hits; Avg. = Batting average; HR = Home runs; RBI = Runs batted in

Other batters
Note: G = Games played; AB = At bats; H = Hits; Avg. = Batting average; HR = Home runs; RBI = Runs batted in

Pitching

Starting pitchers
Note: G = Games pitched; IP = Innings pitched; W = Wins; L = Losses; ERA = Earned run average; SO = Strikeouts

Other pitchers
Note: G = Games pitched; IP = Innings pitched; W = Wins; L = Losses; ERA = Earned run average; SO = Strikeouts

References
1881 Chicago White Stockings season at Baseball Reference

Chicago Cubs seasons
Chicago White Stockings season
National League champion seasons
Chicago White Stockings